Mike Agnew is a retired American soccer midfielder who played professionally in the Major Indoor Soccer League and SISL.

Agnew attended Southern Methodist University where he played on the men's soccer team from 1984 to 1987.  He graduated in 1988 with a bachelor's degree in advertising.  On June 17, 1988, the Baltimore Blast selected Agnew in the first round (fourth overall) of the Major Indoor Soccer League draft.  He played for games for the Blast before being released.  He then moved to the Richardson Rockets for the 1988–89 Southwest Indoor Soccer League season.  He played at least three seasons for Richardson which became known as the Mid-City Rockets during the 1991-1992 season.  Agnew later served as the USISL league director of communications and team services.  He lives in Murphy, Texas where he is director of the Wylie Chamber of Commerce.

References

External links
 Baltimore Blast stats

1965 births
Living people
Soccer players from Texas
Baltimore Blast (1980–1992) players
Major Indoor Soccer League (1978–1992) players
Parade High School All-Americans (boys' soccer)
Dallas Rockets players
USISL players
SMU Mustangs men's soccer players
People from Wylie, Texas
Association football midfielders
American soccer players